Anisynta monticolae, the montane grass-skipper or mountain skipper, is a species of butterfly in the family Hesperiidae. It is found in Australia from the mountains of New South Wales and Victoria.

The wingspan is about 20 mm.

The larvae feed on Poaceae species.

External links
 Australian Caterpillars

Trapezitinae
Butterflies described in 1890
Butterflies of Australia